Étienne Laisné (5 August 1905 – 18 October 1997) was a French racewalker. He competed in the men's 50 kilometres walk at the 1936 Summer Olympics.

References

1905 births
1997 deaths
Athletes (track and field) at the 1936 Summer Olympics
French male racewalkers
Olympic athletes of France
Place of birth missing